The Bridgend Schools Football Association (BSFA) is the governing body of association football in schools in Bridgend, Wales. The association has the ultimate responsibility for the control and development of football for schools in Bridgend County Borough.

It runs numerous competitions, the most well-known of which is the annual FA Challenge Cup. It is also responsible for appointing the management structure of the Bridgend County teams at various age levels.

Formation

The association was formed in July 2007 as the "Bridgend Schools Football League" and became the first unified football league to run in Bridgend schools. 

The first season consisted of six schools. Since then, the number has grown over 3 times that, with 20 schools currently participating in the association's various competitions.

Some schools only participate in the Cup competitions, of which there are two. The BSFA Challenge Cup and the BSFA Plate. The Challenge Cup Final is held on a weekend at a neutral ground and is held as a real FA Cup final - players have to respect the cup protocol and wear shirts and ties to the event which is watched by several dignitaries.

History

League Champions

Cup Champions

*Porthcawl Primary School won their semi-final against Nottage Primary School on penalties, but were unable to field a team for the final.

Notes

School sport in the United Kingdom